Nitzevet bat Adael ( Nīṣṣeḇeṯ baṯ ʿAḏʾēl) is, according to Hanan bar Rava, the mother of David with her husband Jesse. According to the Bible, Jesse had at least nine children: Eliab, Abinadab, Shimma, Nethaneel, Raddai, Ozem, David, Zeruiah, and Abigail.

In the Bible 
Although David's mother is not named in the Bible, she is still mentioned there with her husband: when David was worried about the safety of his parents, he went to Mizpah in Moab to ask permission from the king to allow his father and mother to stay under the royal protection of the king:

In a few Bible translations, Psalm 86:16 (attributed to David) mentions the writer's mother:
Show that you hear me and be kind to me.
I am your servant, so give me strength.
I am your slave, as my mother was, so save me! — Psalms 86:16

References 

Talmud people
Family of David
Women in the Hebrew Bible
Unnamed people of the Bible